Rajshahi Raj was a large zamindari (feudatory kingdom) which occupied a vast position of Bengal (present-day Rajshahi Division, Bangladesh and West Bengal, India). It was the richest and largest zamindari with an area of about 33,670 km2. The Royal Family of Rajshahi used the title Ray/Rai and their surname was Maitra. The zamindari came into being during the early part of the 18th century when Nawab Murshid Quli Khan was the Dewan/Subahdar of Bengal (1704–1727).

The family ruled their dominions and estates from the Natore Palace in present-day Bangladesh. They belonged to the varendra brahmins of Moitra clan, as they were bestowed the title of Rai-Raiyan, they used this title while ruling half of undivided Bengal.They were the most philanthropic among all Bengali Royals. A member of this Raj family, Maharaja Jagadindra Nath Ray (Moitra), was a patron of cricket, and wanted to defeat the British in their own game of cricket. His rival was the Maharaja of Koch Bihar.

References

Further reading
 Jamini Kanta Bhaduri (1912) A Short History Of Natore Raj 
 

Bengali zamindars
Zamindari estates
Quasi-princely estates of India
1710 establishments in Asia
1950 disestablishments in India
Rajshahi District
Bengali Hindus
Bengali families
Bangladeshi Hindus
Bangladeshi families
Hindu families
Indian families